The 2018 Israel State Cup Final decided the winner of the 2017–18 Israel State Cup, the 82nd season of Israel's main football cup. It will be played on  9 May 2018 at the Teddy Stadium in Jerusalem, between Beitar Jerusalem and Hapoel Haifa.

Background
Beitar Jerusalem had previously played 10 Israel cup Finals, had won the competition a record 7 times. Their most recent appearance in the final was tin 2009, in which they won 2–1 against  Maccabi Haifa.

Hapoel Haifa had previously played in 8 finals, winning 3. Their most recent appearance in the final was in 2004, in which they lost 4–1 to Bnei Sakhnin, and their most recent victory in the tournament was in 1974, beating Hapoel Petah Tikva 1–0.

The two teams played each other three times during the 2017–18 Israeli Premier League season until the final. In the first instance, on 16 September 2017 at Teddy Stadium the game end draw 3–3, in the two other times beitar win 2–0 and 1–0 on summy ofer.

Road to the final

Details

References

Israel State Cup
State Cup
Cup 2018
Cup 2018
Israel State Cup matches